George Butterworth (1885–1916) was a British composer.

George Butterworth may also refer to:

George Butterworth (psychologist) (1946–2000), British psychologist
George Butterworth (cartoonist) (1905–1988), British cartoonist
George Michael Butterworth, Old Testament scholar
George Butterworth (tennis) (1858–1941), British tennis player